This article is intended to show a timeline of the history of Belfast, Northern Ireland, up to the present day.

1100–1799
 1177 – The village of Belfast comes under the ownership of John de Courcy after the Battle of Downpatrick.
 1571 – Belfast Castle is granted to Thomas Smith.
 1737 – The city's first newspaper, the Belfast News Letter is established.
 1759 – Population of Belfast is estimated to be 8,000.
 1788 – The Linen Hall Library is establsihed.
 1792 – The Belfast Harp Festival takes place with the aim of reviving Irish traditional music.

1800–1899
 1801 – The Belfast Literary Society is established.
 1808 – Population of Belfast is estimated to be 25,000.
 1814 – The Royal Belfast Academical Institution opens as the Belfast Academical Institution.
 1821 – The Belfast Natural History and Philosophical Society is established.
 1828 – The Botanic Gardens are established.
 1830 – Belfast becomes the world's leading producer of linen.
 1841 – Population of Belfast is estimated to be 70,447 and the city boundary is extended.
 1853 – The city boundary is extended.
 1862 – Ulster Hall opens.
 1871 – Ormeau Park opens.
 1881 – Belfast is given city status.
 1886 – Riots break out between catholic and protestant civilians over tensions arising from the Home Rule Bill.
 1888 – Alexandra Park, Woodvale Park and Belfast Central Library open.
 1895 – The Grand Opera House opens.
 1896 – The city boundary is extended.

1900–1999
 1901 – Population of Belfast is estimated to be 349,180.
 1906 – Belfast City Hall and Victoria Park open.
 1912 – The Titanic leaves Belfast on 2 April and heads for Southampton.
 1921 – Belfast becomes the capital of Northern Ireland.
 1924 – Musgrave Park opens.
 1934 – Belfast Zoo opens to the public.
 1951 – The population of Belfast is estimated to be 443,671.
 1957 – The Ulster Society of Women Artists is established.
 1962 – The Belfast International Arts Festival is established.
 1970 – Fighting breaks out between the IRA and the British Army after the army searches for weapons in the Falls Road area.
 1971 – In August a series of incidents caused by the 1st Battalion, Parachute Regiment of the British Army result in the deaths of 9 people. 3 people are killed in November after the Provisional IRA set off a bomb in the Red Lion Pub. An explosion caused by the Ulster Volunteer Force at McGurk's Bar kills 15 people in December.
 1972 – In March an explosion in Abercorn Restaurant on Castle Lane kills 2 people and injures more than 140. 5 people are killed and 2 people are injured in July when the British Army open fire at civilians in the Springhill Estate. A further 9 people are killed and 130 people are injured later that month when 22 bombs are set off by the Provisional IRA around Belfast in an event that becomes known as Bloody Friday.
 1975 – In April 5 people are killed and 60 are injured when a bomb is detonated in  the Mountain Tavern. A series of attacks in October by the Ulster Volunteer Force across several places in Northern Ireland including Belfast kills 12 people. 
 1988 – 3 people are killed and more than 50 people injured in March when a gunman opens fire during the funeral of Provisional IRA members who died in Gibraltar. Three days later, British Army corporals Derek Wood and David Howes are killed by the IRA after they drove onto a street where an IRA funeral prossession was passing.
 1991 – The Cultúrlann McAdam Ó Fiaich, an Irish language cultural centre, opens.
 1992 – Five people are killed in February when two members of the Ulster Defence Association open fire at Sean Graham bookmakers. In November the Ulster Defence Association attacked James Murray's bookmakers which resulted in the death of 3 people.
 1993 – A bomb explodes on Shankhill Road which kills 10 people.
 1995 – The Belfast Film Festival is established.
 1998 – The Good Friday Agreement is signed in Belfast.

2000–present
 2004 – £26 million is stolen from the headquarters of Northern Bank.
 2007 – The Irish Republican History Museum is established.
 2012 – Titanic Belfast opens.
 2013 – An explosion occurs in the Cathedral Quarter resulting in hundreds of people being evacuated from the city centre.
 2014 – The Duncairn Centre for Arts & Culture opens.
 2021 – Riots break out in the Shankill area of Belfast.
 2022 – The Europa Hotel is evacuated after a fire breaks out.

References

 Timeline
Belfast
Belfast-related lists